Kapuyt is a village in the Vayk Municipality of the Vayots Dzor Province of Armenia.

References

External links 

Populated places in Vayots Dzor Province